Glenmoor is an unincorporated community and census-designated place in southwestern St. Clair Township, Columbiana County, Ohio, United States. The population was 1,829 at the 2020 census. Glenmoor is located in the Salem micropolitan area and the greater Youngstown–Warren area.

Geography
Glenmoor is located in southeastern Columbiana County at  (40.665198, -80.613044), in the southwest corner of St. Clair Township. Its northeast border is formed by U.S. Route 30, across which is the CDP of Calcutta. It is bordered to the south by La Croft in Liverpool Township and to the west by Madison Township.

Demographics

As of the census of 2000, there were 2,192 people, 877 households, and 637 families residing in the CDP. The population density was 783.6 people per square mile (302.3/km2). There were 913 housing units at an average density of 326.4/sq mi (125.9/km2). The racial makeup of the CDP was 97.54% White, 1.19% African American, 0.27% Native American, 0.14% Asian, 0.09% from other races, and 0.78% from two or more races. Hispanic or Latino of any race were 0.73% of the population.

There were 877 households, out of which 28.6% had children under the age of 18 living with them, 56.6% were married couples living together, 11.9% had a female householder with no husband present, and 27.3% were non-families. 22.8% of all households were made up of individuals, and 12.8% had someone living alone who was 65 years of age or older. The average household size was 2.50 and the average family size was 2.92.

In the CDP the population was spread out, with 23.6% under the age of 18, 6.3% from 18 to 24, 27.9% from 25 to 44, 24.0% from 45 to 64, and 18.2% who were 65 years of age or older. The median age was 41 years. For every 100 females there were 94.7 males. For every 100 females age 18 and over, there were 89.3 males.

The median income for a household in the CDP was $30,383, and the median income for a family was $36,667. Males had a median income of $32,452 versus $17,209 for females. The per capita income for the CDP was $14,809. About 4.6% of families and 6.9% of the population were below the poverty line, including 15.3% of those under age 18 and 4.2% of those age 65 or over.

Education
Children in Glenmoor are served by the East Liverpool City School District. The current schools serving Glenmoor are:
 La Croft Elementary School – grades K-4
 Westgate Middle School – grades 5–6
 East Liverpool Junior/Senior High School – grades 7–12

Glenmoor is also home to the private East Liverpool Christian School.

References

Census-designated places in Columbiana County, Ohio